The Emperor of Sydney is a play by Australian playwright Louis Nowra, the third part of the Boyce trilogy following The Woman with Dog's Eyes and The Marvellous Boy. The play is a single continuous scene set at night in the living room of Beauchamp, the Boyce family mansion, where the father is dying upstairs.

It was first performed at the SWB Stables on 16 August 2006 by the Griffin Theatre Company with the following cast:

Voice (of Malcolm Boyce, dying patriarchal property developer): doubled by the actors playing his sons
Keith, his eldest son: Jack Finsterer
Todd, his middle son: Alex Dimitriades
Luke, his youngest son: Toby Schmitz
Diane, Todd’s wife: Anita Hegh
Gillian, Keith’s wife: Sibylla Budd

The production:
Director: David Berthold 
Designer Nicholas Dare
Lighting designer: Matt Marshall

References

Nowra, Louis, The Boyce trilogy, Sydney: Currency Press, 2007.

External links
 Interview with actors Alex Dimitriades and Sibylla Budd

Plays by Louis Nowra
2006 plays